This page describes the qualification procedure for EuroBasket Women 2017.

Qualifying draw
The draw for the qualification took place on 4 July 2014 in Munich, Germany. 

 Teams marked in bold have qualified for EuroBasket Women 2017.

Groups
The nine group winners and six best second-placed teams qualified for the 2017 edition. To determine the best second-placed teams, the results against the fourth-placed team in the specific group were disregarded.

Group A

Group B

Group C

Group D

Group E

Group F

Group G

Group H

Group I

Ranking of second-placed teams
The six best second-placed teams from the groups qualified for the final tournament. Matches against the fourth-placed team in each group are not included in this ranking.

References

External links
EuroBasket Women 2017

EuroBasket Women qualification
EuroBasket Women 2017
2015–16 in European women's basketball
2016–17 in European women's basketball
February 2016 sports events in Europe
November 2016 sports events in Europe